James Patrick Downey III (born August 7, 1992) is an American submission grappler, freestyle wrestler, and professional mixed martial artist who competes in the middleweight division. As an amateur wrestler, Downey competed at 86 kilograms and was a 2019 Pan American Games medalist and the 2019 US Open National champion. In college, he was an NCAA Division I All–American in 2016 for the Iowa State Cyclones and an NJCAA champion for Iowa Central Community College.

Folkstyle career

High school 
Downey attended North County High School and Loch Raven High School, where he was a three-sport athlete, competing in wrestling, football and lacrosse. After placing third at the MPSSAA championships as a freshman, he went on to win the tournament every year and also won the NHSCA and USAW National Championships before his graduation in 2011. As a football player, he set a school record for total offense in a game with 420 total yards on 315 yards passing and 105 yards rushing his senior year and was one of three Maryland prep quarterbacks selected to the prestigious Super-22 Team. A legally problematic high schooler, Downey was multiple times denied of wrestling and playing football due to multiple charges.

College

University of Nebraska 
After being invited to train at the United States Olympic Training Center by Bobby Douglas, he started residing and training in there. During his stay, he met Olympic Gold medalist and University of Nebraska graduate Jordan Burroughs, who played a big part on Downey's recruiting. He was accepted by the Nebraska Cornhuskers and was supposed to attend the University of Nebraska, but as a recently turned 21 year–old, he got sidetracked on partying. This caused head coach Mark Manning's decision of cutting Downey off the team, suggesting him to start a mixed martial arts career after breaking his thumb in a street fight.

Iowa Central Community College 
After his deflected time at UNL, Downey attended Iowa Central Community College, an NJCAA level school. As a redshirt freshman competing at 197 pounds, he compiled an undefeated record and became the '15 NJCAA champion (helping the Tritons reach the team championship). He also went 10–1 against NCAA Division I competition, recording notable victories over Hawkeyes, Cornhuskers, Quakers, Sun Devils, etc.

Iowa State University 
After putting things back on track, Downey was given two options; Iowa State University and University of Iowa. He ended up deciding to wear the Cyclones' cardinal and gold clothes, stating that some of the factors of his decision were his connections with coaches Kevin Jackson and Trent and Travis Paulson and his preference of the teammates. During his sophomore season (2015–16), he competed just three times and lost one of the matches, but still was the starter for the post-season at 197 pounds. He placed third at the Big 12 Conference championships and entered the NCAA championships unseeded. He performed well, taking out multiple high-seeded wrestlers to place fifth, earning All-American honors.

As a junior, he was finding high success at 184 pounds during the regular season, posting seven wins and no losses. On February 23, 2017, it was announced that Downey had been kicked off the wrestling team due to "repeated violations of team rules", as quoted by head coach Kevin Jackson. Despite some talks about a potential run as an Iowa Hawkeye, this finished Downey's collegiate wrestling career and he earned his degree from ISU via online courses.

Freestyle career

Junior level 
Downey was a standout junior level freestyle wrestler until 2014, year in which his eligibility to compete at this level expired. After failing to make the 2012 Senior US Olympic Team, he made the Junior World Team and went on to win a silver medal at the World Championships. He was also a FILA and USAW National Champion.

Senior level

2011–2016 
He made his debut in 2011 (fresh out of high school) at the OTT qualifiers in an attempt to make the Olympic Team, but was unsuccessful after losing in the first round to eventual UFC champion and then NCAA DII champion Kamaru Usman. He competed just once between 2012 and 2013 and made his return in 2014. In this year, he won the Northern Plains tournament, placed sixth at the University Nationals and attended the World Team Trials. A year later, he competed at the ASICS US Nationals, the Northern Plains and the Bill Farrell Memorial but did not place, unlike the University Nationals in where he placed fourth. In 2016, he just wrestled one match.

2017–2018 
In 2017, he made a return to freestyle in big fashion with a fifth-place finish at the US Open, which qualified him for the World Team Trials. At the WTT, he defeated two-time All-American turned MMA fighter Kyle Crutchmer but subsequently dropped his next two bouts. To close the year, he racked up a bronze medal from the Dave Schultz Memorial Invitational. In 2018, he once again placed at the US Open and (unlike the previous year) at the World Team Trials.

2019–2020 
Downey completed his best year of competition as of now in 2019, as he racked up titles from the Dave Schultz Memorial International and the US Open and made the World Team after defeating Nick Heflin in the challenge finals and the defending World Champion David Taylor could not make it to Final X. After successfully making the team, Downey won a prestigious Pan American Games medal and went 2–1 at the World Championships. He then participated in a Super Fight against the accomplished submission grappler Nick Rodriguez, whom he tech'd after scoring 12 points to none.

In 2020, he won a bronze medal at the Matteo Pellicone Ranking Series in Italy and had a brief appearance at the Ivan Yarygin Golden Grand Prix. In February 2020, Downey competed at a special event where he faced the often referred as "Greatest Submission Grappler of All Time" Gordon Ryan. This event consisted of a freestyle wrestling match and a submission grappling match. In the wrestling match, Downey tech'd Ryan in seconds. In the sub only portion of the match, Downey tapped out to Ryan via 3/4 nelson.

Downey was scheduled to compete at the 2020 US Olympic Team Trials on April 4 at State College, Pennsylvania. However, the event was postponed for 2021 along with the Summer Olympics due to the COVID-19 pandemic, leaving all the qualifiers unable to compete.

After the Olympic Trials were postponed, Downey participated in the first wrestling event of the United States during the COVID-19 pandemic on June 28, at Rumble on the Rooftop. He faced Greco-Roman World Team Member Joe Rau in a mixed-rules match, this consisted in one period of Greco-Roman rules and other of freestyle rules, with no technical falls. After choosing Greco-Roman in the first period, Downey was down 9 points to none and could just pick up four points during the freestyle period, dropping the match 4–9.

Controversies 
After several tweets where he made comments towards Greco-Roman and women's wrestling, Downey was dropped by the NJRTC, terminated by Paradigm Sport Management and Barbarian Appel and also lost his spot at the FloWrestling: Dake vs. Chamizo card where he was supposed to wrestle 2018 World Champion David Taylor on July 25, in a 5–day period.

2021 
After more than a year of inactiveness, Downey wrestled at the UWW Matteo Pellicone Ranking Series on March 7, at 92 kilograms, where he went 0–4. Downey then competed at the rescheduled US Olympic Team Trials in April, finishing fourth after going 1–2.

Downey was scheduled to face two-time US Open National champion at 97 kg Kyven Gadson on August 13 in an adapted folkstyle match at the Stalemates Street League event. However, Downey did not show up to the event. He was then scheduled to trim down to 79 kilograms and compete at the 2021 US World Team Trials on September 11–12, but once again did not show up.

Legal issues 
In November 2009, Downey was charged with first-degree assault, after Baltimore Police stated he had beaten up a Towson University student in a parking lot. According to police, Downey broke the student's jaw and knocked off four of his teeth. In June 4 of 2010, Downey was once again charged with second-degree assault along with former teammate from North County HS Patrick Carey, after allegedly brawling with two Navy football players at a night club. Downey was also charged with assault and robbery in September 2010, when he was accused of beating up a classmate who sold him and two of Downey's friends marijuana after refusing to pay him, however, charges were dropped due to repeated changes in the victim's testimony.

After a trial that took place in July 2011, where Downey was facing up to 35 years of prison, Downey pled guilty to his crimes committed in November 2009, spending six days in jail. In 2017, Downey referred to his antics as a high schooler:

Mixed martial arts career

Bellator MMA 
Downey was formerly signed with Paradigm Sport Management and is now signed with SuckerPunch Entertainment. Downey first announced his intentions of pursuing mixed martial arts in 2018 and was scheduled to make his amateur debut in 2019 in a cancelled bout. Downey was rumored to make his professional debut on May 21, 2021, at LFA 108, in a middleweight bout, but an appearance never materialized.

On January 6, 2022 it was announced that Downey had signed with Bellator MMA and will reportedly make his debut later in the year. Downey was scheduled to make his MMA debut against Daniel Compton on April 15, 2022 at Bellator 277. After developing Red skin syndrome, Downey was forced to pull out of the bout.

Downey made his MMA and Bellator debut, facing Keyes Nelson, on August 12, 2022 at Bellator 284. He won the fight via arm-triangle choke 36 seconds into the bout.

Downey faced Christian Echols on December 9, 2022, at Bellator 289. Despite being a nearly 20-to-1 favorite, he lost the fight via knockout in the first round.

In February 2023, it was announced that Downey was released from Bellator.

Mixed martial arts record

|-
|Loss
|align=center|1–1
|Christian Echols
|KO (punches)
|Bellator 289
|
|align=center|1
|align=center|2:27
|Uncasville, Connecticut, United States
|
|-
|Win
|align=center|1–0
|Keyes Nelson
|Submission (arm-triangle choke)
|Bellator 284
|
|align=center|1
|align=center|0:36
|Sioux Falls, South Dakota, United States
|

Submission grappling career 
In February 2020, Downey competed at a special event where he faced the often referred as "Greatest Submission Grappler of All Time" Gordon Ryan in two matches, one consisting of wrestling rules and the other of grappling rules. In the grappling match, the unexperienced Downey tapped out to a half nelson hold. He was then slated to face Nick Rodriguez with submission grappling rules on March, in a rematch from their freestyle wrestling match in 2019, but the event was cancelled due to the COVID-19 pandemic.

Downey made his return to the sport at Subversiv 5 on May 1, 2021 defeating Rasheed Perez by unanimous decision and scoring a highlight reel suplex. Downey then competed at the prestigious Third Coast Grappling Middleweight Grand Prix on June 19, being eliminated in the first match by multiple time color belt World Champion Pedro Marinho. He was then scheduled to compete at a Sub Spectrum event on August 14, one day after a wrestling match with Kyven Gadson, but did not show up to either event.

Submission grappling record 
{| class="wikitable sortable" style="font-size:80%; text-align:left;"
|-
| colspan=9 style="text-align:center;" | 3 Matches, 1 Win, 2 Losses (2 Submissions)
|-
!  Result
!  Rec.
!  Opponent
!  Method
!  Event
!  Division
!  Type
!  Year
!  Location
|-
! style=background:white colspan=9 |
|-
|Loss||style="text-align:center;"|1–2|| Pedro Marinho || Submission (heel hook)|| 3CG 7: The Middleweights || 85 kg || Nogi || June 19, 2021 || Houston, Texas
|-
|Win||style="text-align:center;"|1–1|| Rasheed Perez ||Decision (unanimous)|| Subversiv 5 || Superfight || Nogi || May 2, 2021 || Miami, Florida
|-
|Loss||style="text-align:center;"|0–1|| Gordon Ryan ||Submission (half nelson)|| BJJ Fanatics || Superfight || Nogi ||February 29, 2020|| Beverly, Massachusetts
|-

Freestyle record 

! colspan="7"| Senior Freestyle Matches
|-
!  Res.
!  Record
!  Opponent
!  Score
!  Date
!  Event
!  Location
|-
! style=background:white colspan=7 |
|-
|Loss
|61–40
|align=left| Zahid Valencia
|style="font-size:88%"|TF 1–11
|style="font-size:88%" rowspan=3|April 2–3, 2021
|style="font-size:88%" rowspan=3|2020 US Olympic Team Trials
|style="text-align:left;font-size:88%;" rowspan=3| Forth Worth, Texas
|-
|Win
|61–39
|align=left| Aaron Brooks
|style="font-size:88%"|TF 11–0
|-
|Loss
|60–39
|align=left| Bo Nickal
|style="font-size:88%"|TF 3–13
|-
! style=background:white colspan=7 | 
|-
|Loss 
|60–38
|align=left| Selim Yaşar
|style="font-size:88%"|1–6
|style="font-size:88%" rowspan=2|March 7, 2021
|style="font-size:88%" rowspan=2|Matteo Pellicone Ranking Series 2021
|style="text-align:left;font-size:88%;" rowspan=2|
 Rome, Italy
|-
|Loss 
|60–37
|align=left| Erhan Yaylacı
|style="font-size:88%"|2–11
|-
|Win
|60–36
|align=left| Gordon Ryan
|style="font-size:88%"|TF 11–0
|style="font-size:88%"|February 29, 2020
|style="font-size:88%"|2020 BJJ Fanatics Grand Prix
|style="text-align:left;font-size:88%;" |
 Beverly, Massachusetts
|-
! style=background:white colspan=7 |
|-
|Loss
|59–36
|align=left| Soslan Ktsoyev
|style="font-size:88%"|6–6
|style="font-size:88%"|January 23–26, 2020 
|style="font-size:88%"|Golden Grand Prix Ivan Yarygin 2020
|style="text-align:left;font-size:88%;" |
 Krasnoyarsk, Russia
|-
! style=background:white colspan=7 |
|-
|Win
|59–35
|align=left| Illia Archaia
|style="font-size:88%"|13–7
|style="font-size:88%" rowspan=4|January 15–18, 2020 
|style="font-size:88%" rowspan=4|Matteo Pellicone Ranking Series 2020
|style="text-align:left;font-size:88%;" rowspan=4|
 Rome, Italy
|-
|Loss
|58–35
|align=left| Alex Dieringer
|style="font-size:88%"|2–3
|-
|Win
|58–34
|align=left| Ethan Ramos
|style="font-size:88%"|9–5
|-
|Win
|57–34
|align=left| Osman Göcen
|style="font-size:88%"|12–5
|-
|Win
|56–34
|align=left| Nick Rodriguez
|style="font-size:88%"|TF 12–0
|style="font-size:88%"|October 4–5, 2019
|style="font-size:88%"|2019 Who's Number One
|style="text-align:left;font-size:88%;" |
 Iowa City, Iowa
|-
! style=background:white colspan=7 | 
|-
|Loss
|55–34
|align=left| Ahmed Dudarov
|style="font-size:88%"|TF 0–13
|style="font-size:88%" rowspan=3|September 21–22, 2019
|style="font-size:88%" rowspan=3|2019 World Championships
|style="text-align:left;font-size:88%;" rowspan=3|
 Nur-Sultan, Kazakhstan
|-
|Win
|55–33
|align=left| Zbigniew Baranowski
|style="font-size:88%"|8–2
|-
|Win
|54–33
|align=left| Hovhannes Mkhitaryan
|style="font-size:88%"|TF 11–1
|-
! style=background:white colspan=7 | 
|-
|Win
|53–33
|align=left| Alexander Moore
|style="font-size:88%"|Fall
|style="font-size:88%" rowspan=3|August 10, 2019
|style="font-size:88%" rowspan=3|2019 Pan American Games
|style="text-align:left;font-size:88%;" rowspan=3|
 Lima, Peru
|-
|Loss
|52–33
|align=left| Yurieski Torreblanca
|style="font-size:88%"|2–7
|-
|Win
|52–32
|align=left| Angus Arthur
|style="font-size:88%"|TF 14–3
|-
! style=background:white colspan=7 | 
|-
|Loss
|51–32
|align=left| Osman Göcen
|style="font-size:88%"|6–7
|style="font-size:88%" rowspan=2|July 11–14, 2019
|style="font-size:88%" rowspan=2|2019 Yasar Dogu International
|style="text-align:left;font-size:88%;" rowspan=2|
 Istanbul, Turkey
|-
|Loss
|51–31
|align=left| Deepak Punia
|style="font-size:88%"|5–11
|-
! style=background:white colspan=7 |
|-
|Win
|51–30
|align=left| Nick Heflin
|style="font-size:88%"|4–0
|style="font-size:88%" rowspan=2|May 17–19, 2019
|style="font-size:88%" rowspan=2|2019 US World Team Trials Challenge
|style="text-align:left;font-size:88%;" rowspan=2|
 Raleigh, North Carolina
|-
|Win
|50–30
|align=left| Nick Heflin
|style="font-size:88%"|6–2
|-
! style=background:white colspan=7 | 
|-
|Win
|49–30
|align=left| Nick Heflin
|style="font-size:88%"|10–4
|style="font-size:88%" rowspan=6|April 24–27, 2019
|style="font-size:88%" rowspan=6|2019 US Open National Championships
|style="text-align:left;font-size:88%;" rowspan=6|
 Las Vegas, Nevada
|-
|Win
|48–30
|align=left| Myles Martin
|style="font-size:88%"|9–7
|-
|Win
|47–30
|align=left| Kenneth Courts
|style="font-size:88%"|9–4
|-
|Win
|46–30
|align=left| Kevin Parker
|style="font-size:88%"|Fall
|-
|Win
|45–30
|align=left| Pat Romero
|style="font-size:88%"|TF 13–0
|-
|Win
|44–30
|align=left| Cameron Caffey
|style="font-size:88%"|10–4
|-
! style=background:white colspan=7 | 
|-
|Loss
|43–30
|align=left| Yorli Jimenez
|style="font-size:88%"|
|style="font-size:88%" rowspan=2|February 15–23, 2019
|style="font-size:88%" rowspan=2|2019 Granma y Cerro Pelado International
|style="text-align:left;font-size:88%;" rowspan=2|
 Havana, Cuba
|-
|Loss
|43–29
|align=left| Yurieski Torreblanca
|style="font-size:88%"|
|-
! style=background:white colspan=7 | 
|-
|Win
|43–28
|align=left| Kenneth Courts
|style="font-size:88%"|TF 12–2
|style="font-size:88%" rowspan=3|January 24–26, 2019
|style="font-size:88%" rowspan=3|2019 Dave Schultz Memorial International
|style="text-align:left;font-size:88%;" rowspan=3|
 Colorado Springs, Colorado
|-
|Win
|42–28
|align=left| Brett Pfarr
|style="font-size:88%"|7–4
|-
|Win
|41–28
|align=left| Josh Asper
|style="font-size:88%"|6–4
|-
! style=background:white colspan=7 |
|-
|Loss
|40–28
|align=left| Slavik Naniev
|style="font-size:88%"|4–7
|style="font-size:88%" |December 7–9, 2018
|style="font-size:88%" |2018 Alany International
|style="text-align:left;font-size:88%;" |
 Vladikavkaz, Russia
|-
! style=background:white colspan=7 |
|-
|Loss
|40–27
|align=left| Richard Perry
|style="font-size:88%"|4–7
|style="font-size:88%" |July 23, 2018
|style="font-size:88%" |2018 US World Team Trials True Thirds
|style="text-align:left;font-size:88%;" |
 Bethlehem, Pennsylvania
|-
|Win
|40–26
|align=left| Joe Rau
|style="font-size:88%"|7–0
|style="font-size:88%" rowspan=3|May 18–20, 2018
|style="font-size:88%" rowspan=3|2018 US World Team Trials Challenge
|style="text-align:left;font-size:88%;" rowspan=3|
 Rochester, Minnesota
|-
|Win
|39–26
|align=left| Ryan McWatters
|style="font-size:88%"|10–5
|-
|Loss
|38–26
|align=left| Joe Rau
|style="font-size:88%"|2–7
|-
! style=background:white colspan=7 | 
|-
|Win
|38–25
|align=left| Brandon Supernaw
|style="font-size:88%"|TF 10–0
|style="font-size:88%" rowspan=5|April 24–28, 2018
|style="font-size:88%" rowspan=5|2018 US Open National Championships
|style="text-align:left;font-size:88%;" rowspan=5|
 Las Vegas, Nevada
|-
|Loss
|37–25
|align=left| Nick Reenan
|style="font-size:88%"|Fall
|-
|Win
|37–24
|align=left| Noe Garcia
|style="font-size:88%"|Fall
|-
|Win
|36–24
|align=left| Anthony Lodermeier
|style="font-size:88%"|TF 12–2
|-
|Loss
|35–24
|align=left| Dominic Ducharme
|style="font-size:88%"|10–18
|-
! style=background:white colspan=7 |
|-
|Win
|35–23
|align=left| Takahiro Murayama
|style="font-size:88%"|TF 10–0
|style="font-size:88%" rowspan=4|November 1–4, 2017
|style="font-size:88%" rowspan=4|2017 Dave Schultz Memorial Invitational
|style="text-align:left;font-size:88%;" rowspan=4|
 Colorado Springs, Colorado
|-
|Loss
|34–23
|align=left| Richard Perry
|style="font-size:88%"|1–2
|-
|Win
|34–22
|align=left| Kim Gwan-uk
|style="font-size:88%"|2–1
|-
|Loss
|33–22
|align=left| Aleksander Musalaliev
|style="font-size:88%"|2–3
|-
! style=background:white colspan=7 | 
|-
|Loss
|33–21
|align=left| Austin Trotman
|style="font-size:88%"|5–14
|style="font-size:88%" rowspan=3|June 9–10, 2017
|style="font-size:88%" rowspan=3|2017 US World Team Trials Challenge
|style="text-align:left;font-size:88%;" rowspan=3|
 Lincoln, Nebraska
|-
|Loss
|33–20
|align=left| David Taylor
|style="font-size:88%"|TF 0–10
|-
|Win
|33–19
|align=left| Kyle Crutchmer
|style="font-size:88%"|TF 14–1
|-
! style=background:white colspan=7 | 
|-
|Win
|32–19
|align=left| Kyle Crutchmer
|style="font-size:88%"|7–3
|style="font-size:88%" rowspan=8|April 26–29, 2017
|style="font-size:88%" rowspan=8|2017 US Open National Championships
|style="text-align:left;font-size:88%;" rowspan=8|
 Las Vegas, Nevada
|-
|Loss
|31–19
|align=left| Bo Nickal
|style="font-size:88%"|TF 2–12
|-
|Win
|31–18
|align=left| Gabe Dean
|style="font-size:88%"|7–6
|-
|Win
|30–18
|align=left| Josh Asper
|style="font-size:88%"|7–2
|-
|Loss
|29–18
|align=left| David Taylor
|style="font-size:88%"|TF 0–10
|-
|Win
|29–17
|align=left| Peter Renda
|style="font-size:88%"|9–6
|-
|Win
|28–17
|align=left| Ryan McWatters
|style="font-size:88%"|TF 14–4
|-
|Win
|27–17
|align=left| Vic Avery
|style="font-size:88%"|6–4
|-
! style=background:white colspan=7 |
|-
|Loss
|26–17
|align=left| Fırat Binici
|style="font-size:88%"|3–6
|style="font-size:88%" |June 15–17, 2016
|style="font-size:88%" |2016 Poland Open
|style="text-align:left;font-size:88%;" |
 Spala, Poland
|-
! style=background:white colspan=7 |
|-
|Loss
|26–16
|align=left| Richard Perry
|style="font-size:88%"|7–8
|style="font-size:88%" rowspan=6|November 5–7, 2015
|style="font-size:88%" rowspan=6|2015 Bill Farrell International Open
|style="text-align:left;font-size:88%;" rowspan=6|
 New York City, New York
|-
|Win
|26–15
|align=left| Tyler Caldwell
|style="font-size:88%"|7–4
|-
|Win
|25–15
|align=left| Tyrel Todd
|style="font-size:88%"|11–6
|-
|Win
|24–15
|align=left| Alireza Asadinia
|style="font-size:88%"|Fall
|-
|Loss
|23–15
|align=left| Ryan Loder
|style="font-size:88%"|12–16
|-
|Win
|23–14
|align=left| Gwon Hyeok-beom
|style="font-size:88%"|9–5
|-
! style=background:white colspan=7 |
|-
|Loss
|22–14
|align=left |  Ryan Loder
|style="font-size:88%"|5–5
|style="font-size:88%" rowspan=8|May 28–31, 2015
|style="font-size:88%" rowspan=8|2015 US University National Championships
|style="text-align:left;font-size:88%;" rowspan=8| Akron, Ohio
|-
|Win
|22–13
|align=left| Sam Brooks
|style="font-size:88%"|7–7
|-
|Win
|21–13
|align=left| Aaron Studebaker
|style="font-size:88%"|TF 10–0
|-
|Win
|20–13
|align=left| Glenn Climmons
|style="font-size:88%"|8–5
|-
|Loss
|19–13
|align=left| Hayden Zillmer
|style="font-size:88%"|5–8
|-
|Win
|19–12
|align=left| Montrail Johnson
|style="font-size:88%"|TF 10–0
|-
|Win
|18–12
|align=left| Nicholas Veling
|style="font-size:88%"|TF 12–2
|-
|Win
|17–12
|align=left| Lawrence Thomas 
|style="font-size:88%"|8–4
|-
! style=background:white colspan=7 |
|-
|Loss
|16–12
|align=left| Victor Terrell
|style="font-size:88%"|3–7
|style="font-size:88%" rowspan=3|May 14–16, 2015
|style="font-size:88%" rowspan=3|2015 Northern Plains Regional Championships
|style="text-align:left;font-size:88%;" rowspan=3|
 Waterloo, Iowa
|-
|Win
|16–11
|align=left| Cody Caldwell
|style="font-size:88%"|TF 12–1
|-
|Win
|15–11
|align=left| Dane Pestano 
|style="font-size:88%"|TF 10–0
|-
! style=background:white colspan=7 |
|-
|Loss
|14–11
|align=left| Richard Perry
|style="font-size:88%"|Fall
|style="font-size:88%" rowspan=5|May 5–9, 2015
|style="font-size:88%" rowspan=5|2015 ASICS US Senior Nationals
|style="text-align:left;font-size:88%;" rowspan=5|
 Las Vegas, Nevada
|-
|Win
|14–10
|align=left| Robert Hamlin
|style="font-size:88%"|6–5
|-
|Win
|13–10
|align=left| Adam Fierro
|style="font-size:88%"|7–2
|-
|Loss
|12–10
|align=left| Deron Winn
|style="font-size:88%"|1–7
|-
|Win
|12–9
|align=left| Quentin Wright 
|style="font-size:88%"|Fall
|-
! style=background:white colspan=7 |
|-
|Loss
|11–9
|align=left| Enock Francois
|style="font-size:88%"|Fall
|style="font-size:88%" rowspan=2|May 29 – June 1, 2014
|style="font-size:88%" rowspan=2|2014 US World Team Trials
|style="text-align:left;font-size:88%;" rowspan=2|
 Madison, Wisconsin
|-
|Loss
|11–8
|align=left| Robert Hamlin
|style="font-size:88%"|4–7
|-
! style=background:white colspan=7 |
|-
|Loss
|11–7
|align=left| Chris Perry
|style="font-size:88%"|4–10
|style="font-size:88%" rowspan=5|May 22–25, 2014
|style="font-size:88%" rowspan=5|2014 US University National Championships
|style="text-align:left;font-size:88%;" rowspan=5| Akron, Ohio
|-
|Win
|11–6
|align=left| John Lampe
|style="font-size:88%"|TF 10–0
|-
|Win
|10–6
|align=left| Kenneth Courts
|style="font-size:88%"|17–13
|-
|Win
|9–6
|align=left| Rory Bonner
|style="font-size:88%"|TF 11–1
|-
|Win
|8–6
|align=left| Trent Noon 
|style="font-size:88%"|6–4
|-
! style=background:white colspan=7 |
|-
|Win
|7–6
|align=left| Bruce Toal
|style="font-size:88%"|TF 11–1
|style="font-size:88%" rowspan=3|May 8–10, 2014
|style="font-size:88%" rowspan=3|2014 Northern Plains Regional Championships
|style="text-align:left;font-size:88%;" rowspan=3|
 Waterloo, Iowa
|-
|Win
|6–6
|align=left| Justin Koethe
|style="font-size:88%"|TF 11–0
|-
|Win
|5–6
|align=left| Dan Olsen 
|style="font-size:88%"|Fall
|-
! style=background:white colspan=7 |
|-
|Loss
|4–6
|align=left| Tamerlan Tagziev
|style="font-size:88%"|0–5, 0–5
|style="font-size:88%" rowspan=3|November 8–10, 2012
|style="font-size:88%" rowspan=3|2012 NYAC Holiday International Open
|style="text-align:left;font-size:88%;" rowspan=3|
 New York City, New York
|-
|Win
|4–5
|align=left| Mathieu Deschatelets
|style="font-size:88%"|4–1, 6–0
|-
|Loss
|3–5
|align=left| Selim Yaşar
|style="font-size:88%"|0–3, 2–1, 0–1
|-
! style=background:white colspan=7 |
|-
|Loss
|3–4
|align=left| Evan Brown
|style="font-size:88%"|1–0, 0–1, 0–4
|style="font-size:88%" rowspan=3|December 3, 2011 
|style="font-size:88%" rowspan=3|2011 US Olympic Team Trials Qualifier
|style="text-align:left;font-size:88%;" rowspan=3|
 Las Vegas, Nevada
|-
|Win
|3–3
|align=left| Cody Powers
|style="font-size:88%"|Fall
|-
|Loss
|2–3
|align=left| Kamaru Usman
|style="font-size:88%"|1–1, 3–3, 0–4
|-
! style=background:white colspan=7 |
|-
|Loss
|2–2
|align=left| Kurt Brenner
|style="font-size:88%"|1–3, 4–0, 3–5
|style="font-size:88%" rowspan=4|November 11–13, 2011 
|style="font-size:88%" rowspan=4|2011 NYAC Holiday International Open
|style="text-align:left;font-size:88%;" rowspan=4|
 New York City, New York
|-
|Win
|2–1
|align=left| Eyad Abujaradeh
|style="font-size:88%"|1–0, 5–0
|-
|Loss
|1–1
|align=left| Bryce Hasseman
|style="font-size:88%"|1–1, 0–4
|-
|Win
|1–0
|align=left| Nathanael Ackerman
|style="font-size:88%"|1–0, 4–3
|-

NCAA record 

! colspan="8"| NCAA Division I Record
|-
!  Res.
!  Record
!  Opponent
!  Score
!  Date
!  Event
|-
! style=background:lighgrey colspan=6 |End of 2016-2017 Season (junior year)
|-
|Win
|17–4
|align=left| Drew Foster 
|style="font-size:88%"|9–5
|style="font-size:88%"|January 20, 2017
|style="font-size:88%"|Northern Iowa - Iowa State Dual
|-
|Win
|16–4
|align=left| Daniel Chaid 
|style="font-size:88%"|6–4
|style="font-size:88%"|January 14, 2017
|style="font-size:88%"|Iowa State - North Carolina Dual
|-
|Win
|15–4
|align=left| Conner Small 
|style="font-size:88%"|MD 19–7
|style="font-size:88%"|January 6, 2017
|style="font-size:88%"|Arizona State - Iowa State Dual
|-
|Win
|14–4
|align=left| Casey Crawford 
|style="font-size:88%"|Fall
|style="font-size:88%"|November 13, 2016
|style="font-size:88%"|Harold Nichols Open
|-
|Win
|13–4
|align=left| Tyler McNutt 
|style="font-size:88%"|Fall
|style="font-size:88%"|November 6, 2016
|style="font-size:88%"|Iowa State - North Dakota State Dual
|-
|Win
|12–4
|align=left| Nate Rotert 
|style="font-size:88%"|8–6
|style="font-size:88%"|November 4, 2016
|style="font-size:88%"|Iowa State - South Dakota State Dual
|-
! style=background:lighgrey colspan=6 |Start of 2016-2017 Season (junior year)
|-
! style=background:lighgrey colspan=6 |End of 2015-2016 Season (sophomore year)
|-
! style=background:white colspan=6 |2016 NCAA Championships 5th at 197 lbs
|-
|Win
|11–4
|align=left|Jared Haught
|style="font-size:88%"|Fall
|style="font-size:88%" rowspan=7|March 15–17, 2016
|style="font-size:88%" rowspan=7|2016 NCAA Division I Wrestling Championships
|-
|Loss
|10–4
|align=left|Nathan Burak 
|style="font-size:88%"|SV-1 1-3
|-
|Win
|10–3
|align=left|Brett Harner 
|style="font-size:88%"|3-2
|-
|Win
|9–3
|align=left|Shawn Scott 
|style="font-size:88%"|5-3
|-
|Loss
|8–3
|align=left|Brett Pfarr
|style="font-size:88%"|MD 3-12
|-
|Win
|8–2
|align=left|Jared Haught
|style="font-size:88%"|TB-1 Fall
|-
|Win
|7–2
|align=left|Phil Wellington
|style="font-size:88%"|SV-1 3-1
|-
! style=background:white colspan=6 |2016 Big 12 Championships  at 197 lbs
|-
|Win
|6–2
|align=left| Trent Noon
|style="font-size:88%"|3–1
|style="font-size:88%" rowspan=5|March 3–6, 2016
|style="font-size:88%" rowspan=5|2016 Big 12 Conference Championships
|-
|Win
|5–2
|align=left| Derek Thomas 
|style="font-size:88%"|4–1
|-
|Loss
|4–2
|align=left| Preston Weigel
|style="font-size:88%"|2–6
|-
|Win
|4–1
|align=left| Jake Smith
|style="font-size:88%"|4–1
|-
|Win
|3–1
|align=left| Brad Johnson
|style="font-size:88%"|8–5
|-
|Loss
|2–1
|align=left| Brett Pfarr 
|style="font-size:88%"|MD 1–12
|style="font-size:88%"|February 19, 2016
|style="font-size:88%"|Iowa State - Minnesota Dual
|-
|Win
|2–0
|align=left| Bubba Scheffel 
|style="font-size:88%"|5–4
|style="font-size:88%"|February 14, 2016
|style="font-size:88%"|West Virginia - Iowa State Dual
|-
|Win
|1–0
|align=left| Cody Krumwiede 
|style="font-size:88%"|5–2
|style="font-size:88%"|February 5, 2016
|style="font-size:88%"|Iowa State - Northern Iowa Dual
|-
! style=background:lighgrey colspan=6 |Start of 2015-2016 Season (sophomore year)
|-
! style=background:lighgrey colspan=6 |End of 2014-2015 Season (freshman year)
|-

Stats 

!  Season
!  Year
!  School
!  Rank
!  Weigh Class
!  Record
!  Win
!  Bonus
|-
|2017
|Junior
|rowspan=2|Iowa State University
|#7 (DNQ)
|184
|7–0
|100.00%
|57.14%
|-
|2016
|Sophomore
|#5 (5th)
|rowspan=2|197
|11–4
|73.33%
|13.33%
|-
|2015
|Freshman
|Iowa Central Community College
|#1 (NJCAA)
|10–1
|90.91%
|36-36%
|-
|colspan=5 bgcolor="LIGHTGREY"|Career
|bgcolor="LIGHTGREY"|28–5
|bgcolor="LIGHTGREY"|84.85%
|bgcolor="LIGHTGREY"|30.30%

References

External links
 

American male sport wrestlers
1992 births
Living people
Iowa State Cyclones wrestlers
People from Baltimore
Sportspeople from Maryland
Amateur wrestlers
Iowa State University alumni
Wrestlers at the 2019 Pan American Games
Pan American Games bronze medalists for the United States
Pan American Games medalists in wrestling
Medalists at the 2019 Pan American Games